Nirmala Bhavan Higher Secondary School, founded in 1964, is a girls school run by the Sisters of the Adoration of the Blessed Sacrament(S.A.B.S). This religious congregation was founded in 1908 by the first Bishop of Changanacherry, Mar Thomas Kurialachery.

The school is a minority institution, recognized as such by the Government of Kerala. It is an unaided English medium School and prepares students for the ten year Secondary School Leaving certificate (S.S.L.C) examination of the Kerala State Educational Board and two years Higher Secondary examination course of Higher Secondary Education Directorate.

SMART class
For the first time in Kerala, the school, following the state syllabus, is equipped with SMART CLASS facilities. The program enables the teacher to use digital resources such as graphics, animations, 3D images and video clips in addition to the chalk and talk method of teaching. All class rooms have an Ethernet network, governed by a Knowledge Center within the school campus. The knowledge center is equipped with a library of digital resources mapped to the school syllabus. This program was inaugurated in the school by the Minister for Education, Shri M.A. Baby in June 2006.

Nymf Fiesta 
In 2005, the school became the first girls school to conduct an inter-school cultural fest called 'Nymph Fiesta' which is managed by the higher secondary girls. In 2008 the name was changed to 'Nymf Fiesta'.

References

External links
Official website

Catholic secondary schools in India
Christian schools in Kerala
Girls' schools in Kerala
Private schools in Thiruvananthapuram
High schools and secondary schools in Thiruvananthapuram
Educational institutions established in 1964
1964 establishments in Kerala